is a fictional character from the manga Vinland Saga by Makoto Yukimura. Askeladd, the leader of a band of a hundred Vikings, bargains with Floki to kill Thors. After a fierce swordfight, Thors defeats Askeladd, but surrenders to save Thorfinn and his villagers. After seeing his father's death, Thorfinn swears revenge against Askeladd who recruits him into his group despite knowing his intentions.

The character was created by Yukimura to serve as a mentor to the inexperienced Thorfinn despite both of them being enemies. Yukimura wrote him carefully until his last scene which he calculated by writing his personality. In Japanese the character is voiced by Naoya Uchida while David Wald and Kirk Thornton voice him in two separate English dubs.

Critical response to Askeladd was generally positive for being a striking villain and his misrelationship with Thorfinn. He was also listed as one of the best anime characters of 2019.

Creation
Askeladd shares the name of Askeladden, a Norwegian folk character known for his cleverness. His backstory is based on the early life of Olaf the Peacock, an Icelandic chieftain and major character of Laxdæla saga. Manga author Makoto Yukimura commented that while most Vinland Saga characters were made to assist the protagonist Thorfinn, Askeladd was an exception. Because Thorfinn is inexperienced during the series' beginning, Askeladd was written to be a mentor figure who would lead him in the first story arc. He said that his relationship with Thorfinn was that of a father and son, respectively, as well as of enemies. The more the manga author wrote these two characters the more ambiguous it became as he could not tell Askeladd was a good person or a hateful one. Askeladd had several contradictions but he felt he was interesting like this. Yukimura early considered Askeladd a rudderless, disobedient habit that does its job and has some interesting behavior. While strange, he felt like it was a product of chance. Since the series is based on vikings, Yukimura went to Norway and Scandinavia in 2003 to conduct research on vikings. He was able to see Oseberg Ship which he says is the most beautiful ship he has ever seen which Askeladd's forces use.

While Yukimura early planned Askeladd's death after killing King Sweyn, he was confused about how his last reunion with Thorfinn would work. In retrospect, he found it a strange experience.

Casting
Naoya Uchida received the offer from the studio to voice Askeladd. He was asked not to read the original manga during the recording of the series. Despite Thorfinn's role, Uchida said his character has always been at the center of the story, and he was able to focus on the role and felt it was comfortable to play. At first, it was difficult to grasp the image of the character, but as he acted, he was made to feel the human way of life that is moved by the past and changes occur again depending on the reality in front of him. In recording of the series, Uchida met Hiroki Yasumoto, who played Bjorn, Askeladd's subordinate. He was impressed by Yuto Uemura and Matsuda's recording due to the focus they tend to give Askeladd. In his first appearance, the scene was Askeladd's voice from 10 years ago, so Uchida exchanged opinions with the director and adjusted it between three and four times. Following the series' first time-skip, Uchida had a change of mind in regards to his character due to the flashback that despicts his past.

David Wald played the character in the Sentai Filmworks dub, while Kirk Thornton replaced him in the English dub. Dub director Kyle Colby Jones said  Askeladd was going to be Wald because he has "that perfect temperament to be an outright bastard but still likeable".

Characterization and themes
Despite Askeladd being a ruthless and violent character, Yukimura felt that he was still appealing. The author believes that Askeladd tends to escape from battles he cannot win, and thus was out of character when acting desperate in front of Torgrim. His ideal of having more power was the greatest turning point for him. This led to the idea of Askeladd joining forces with Canute to take over Sweyn's forces. Askeladd's last yell towards Thorfinn when he kills Sweyn and pretends being insane was an eventful event for the author due to it being the last time he managed to expresse himself towards the protagonist. Askeladd's humanity is further explored through his relationship with his underling Bjorn whom he kills in combat after he suffers a major wound but gives him a dignified death fitting of what Vikings want to experience.

For the anime adaptation, Studio Wit said there was a strong sense of camaraderie toward an individual, Askeladd, that brought them vikings together. They portrayed Askeladd as being able to take charge because others viewed him as powerful. They were also careful not to depict the supporting characters as overly dependent on their leader, as that would diminish their individual charm. The anime also added new scenes about how Thorfinn turned into one of Askeladd's soldiers rather than just make a time-skip which the manga artist appreciated. The director claimed that for these anime original scenes they also tried to keep Askeladd in-character. He further said that the story about Askeladd's forces was entertaining to see.

Yukimura claimed that due to the Vikings being famous for committing violent deeds he decided to write a story where Askeladd's group murder an innocent Christian family in order to generate a major shock within the readers. "In that world, Christians work hard with fear every day to get to heaven someday, but when they see Askeladd destroy their common sense in such a way, Anne feels guilty for feeling a certain admiration for it." Askeladd's deeds where also meant to shock the only surviving woman who wonders whether the God she prays is not real. Askeladd's violence is also motivated by survival and thus kill people for the sake of it. This was also done because Yukimura wanted the character to be looked more as a villain. In The European Middle Ages through the prism of Contemporary Japanese Literature, Maximen Denise from University of Tours noted the main motivation featured in manga also explore his desire to have power similar to "those who desperately struggle to find their homelands in the 21st century 'medieval' Japan".

Appearances
Askeladd is the commander of a small but powerful Viking band, which owed its success to Askeladd's exceptional intelligence. He is half-Danish and half-Welsh, being the son of a Welsh princess captured by a Viking raider. In his introduction, Askeladd gives missions to the series' protagonist, Thorfinn, during the time his subordinate works should his reward be a duel with him. The misrelationship between Askeladd and Thorfinn is seen in a flashback where Askleadd is ordered to kill the later's father, Thors. Despite being defeated by Thors, Askeladd accomplishes his mission by taking his soldiers hostage. The young Thorfinn would keep chasing Askeladd for a decade until the chance he would accomplish revenge for his father's death.

Askleadd believes in the legend of Avalon, which inspired him to support Prince Canute's bid for kingship of the Danes and ultimately sacrifices himself assassinating King Sweyn in order to install Canute as the Danish King and to ensure the safety of Wales from Denmark. During the Viking invasion and war in England, he manipulates Thorfinn's desire for revenge against him as a way of keeping the gifted young fighter in his service. When Askeladd's soldiers betray him for their safety against Thorkell's soldiers, Thorfinn comes to Askeladd's aid. With Askeladd's aid, Thorfinn manages to defeat Thorkell in a one-on-one combat. Thorkell makes peace with Askeladd who decides to take down King Sweyn with Canture. After meeting the King, Askeladd's soldiers leave him, with the exception his second-in-command, Bjorn, who dies in a duel with him despite both becoming friends. In his last duel with Thorfinn, Askeladd reveals he is the son of the Viking Olaf and a slave woman whom he treated badly. His mother gave him the name Lucius Artorius Castus, the legitimate king of Britain, but he received the nickname Askeladd (covered in ash) as a boy while working for a blacksmith. Askeladd easily defeats Thorfinn and kills King Sweyn while feigning madness. Thorfinn chases Askleadd and finds him being stabbed by Canute. In his last moments, Askeladd is shouted by angered Thorfinn to recover, but Askeladd dies telling Thorfinn to become a true warrior.

Despite Askeladd's death, the character continuous appears in Thorfinn's nightmares that hunt the path he chose after Thors' death. However, upon deciding to bring peace to his friends and family, Thorfinn has an hallucination of Askeladd and Thors when talking with one of his mentors, Leif Erikson. Thorfinn smiles and refers to the three as his fathers.

Reception
Polygon compared Thorfinn to The Northman's protagonists due to their similar quests for revenge and how both are based on historical figures. Polygon further praised the relationship between Thorfinn and Askeladd as the former sees him as both as his biggest enemy and a father figure at the same time due to the time they spend together. Anime News Network listed Askeladd as one of the best characters from 2019 for his striking personality despite his violent actions. In the Anime UK News, he was a runner-up in "Best Character" losing to Senku Ishigami from Dr. Stone. Rebecca Silverman for Anime News Network praised the design of Askeladd for how appealing he as "He practically oozes underhanded nastiness without being drawn as an exaggerated farce of a man". He was also a nominee for best villain in the 4th Crunchyroll Anime Awards.

Otaku USA enjoyed the concept of Askeladd and Thorfinn due to how they become enemies due to the latter's thirst of revenge and how they become allies at the same moment. UK Anime Network found him enjoyable due to how he takes Thorfinn and, more importantly, Canute which makes a major change in the narrative. Askeladd's death was praised for the impact he makes on Thorfinn as the dying warrior sees his subordinate in a sympathetic form during his last moments. Anime News Network highlighted how carefully planned Askeladd accepted his death when being provoked by the King and decided to kill him regardless of cost. As a result, the reviewer said that "To put it bluntly, Askeladd's death scene is probably the single best moment of the series" due to the impact it has on Canute and Thorfinn. Comic Book Resources listed him as a character who needs his own spin-off based on his backstory briefly shown in the series.

Golden Kamuy artist Satoru Noda said Askeladd is his favorite character from Vinland Saga as he exudes Yukimura's own personality the most. He also stated that he liked skillful professionals like the Ear, but even when he think that he is good, he laughed when seeing his cruel, merciless eyes. In response, Yukimura was glad by the answer and said the character became ambiguous even to himself. Hajime Isayama, the creator of Attack on Titan, was surprised by Askeladd's death, most specifically by how Wit Studio animated it in the season finale. Thorkell's Japanese voice actor Akio Otsuka also praised Naoya Uchiha's performance as Askeladd.

References

External links
  

Fictional mass murderers
Comics characters introduced in 2005
Fictional patricides
Fictional swordfighters in anime and manga
Fictional Vikings
Male characters in anime and manga
Male characters in television